Mohammad Aamir Latif was the former governor of Faryab Province, Afghanistan.

References

Year of birth missing (living people)
Living people
Governors of Faryab Province
Place of birth missing (living people)